"I Meant to Do That" is a song co-written and recorded by Canadian country music artist Paul Brandt.  It was released in November 1996 as the third single from his debut album Calm Before the Storm.  The song reached number 39 on the Billboard Hot Country Singles & Tracks chart and number 1 on the Canadian RPM Country Tracks chart.  It was written by Brandt, Kerry Chater and Lynn Gillespie Chater.

Chart performance

Year-end charts

References

Allmusic
CMT

1996 singles
Paul Brandt songs
Song recordings produced by Josh Leo
Reprise Records singles
Music videos directed by Steven Goldmann
Songs written by Kerry Chater
1996 songs
Songs written by Paul Brandt